In graph theory, path coloring usually refers to one of two problems:
Set  and graph  are provided at input.
Set  and graph  are provided at input. This problem is a special case of a more general class of graph routing problems, known as call scheduling.
In both the above problems, the goal is usually to minimise the number of colors used in the coloring. In different variants of path coloring,  may be a simple graph, digraph or multigraph.

References
The Complexity of Path Coloring and Call Scheduling by Thomas Erlebach and Klaus Jansen
A compendium of NP optimization problems by Viggo Kann (problem: Minimum Path Coloring)
Graph coloring